Kgothatso Montjane (born 3 June 1986) is a South African wheelchair tennis player. In 2018, she became the first black South African woman to compete at Wimbledon.

Early life
Montjane was born in Seshego on the periphery of Polokwane, Limpopo with a congenital disorder which affected both of her hands and a foot with the other foot being amputated by the age of 12.

Career

Montjane is a successful wheelchair tennis player who is placed in the top 10 of the ITF ranking. Her highest rank was 5 in the world in 2005. She was named South Africa's disabled sportswoman of the year three times, in 2005, 2011 and 2015. Montjane holds 29 singles titles and won tournaments such as the wheelchair Belgian Open and Swiss Open. She is also successful in doubles, where she won, among others, the Belgian Open in 2015 together with Jordanne Whiley. In 2013 and 2014, she participated in 3 of the 4 Grand Slam tournaments, Australian Open, Roland Garros and US Open, where she was able to reach the quarter and semifinals in the singles and the semifinals in all of the doubles tournaments.

She was a member of the South African team at the 2008, 2012 and 2016 Summer Paralympics, but was not able to secure a medal. Besides being a Paralympian, she was a 2009 and 2011 World Team Cup participant for South Africa.

In 2018, she managed to qualify for the prestigious Wimbledon tournament, the first black South African woman to do so. In the same year, she also competed at the US Open and became therefore the first African wheelchair tennis player to qualify for all four Grand Slam tournaments in the same year.

References

External links
 
 
 Personal webpage

1986 births
Living people
South African female tennis players
Paralympic wheelchair tennis players of South Africa
Wheelchair tennis players at the 2008 Summer Paralympics
Wheelchair tennis players at the 2012 Summer Paralympics
Wheelchair tennis players at the 2016 Summer Paralympics
People from Polokwane Local Municipality
Sportspeople from Limpopo
20th-century South African women
21st-century South African women